In probability theory, the Type-2 Gumbel probability density function is

for

.

For  the mean is infinite. For  the variance is infinite.

The cumulative distribution function is

The moments  exist for 

The distribution is named after Emil Julius Gumbel (1891 – 1966).

Generating random variates 

Given a random variate U drawn from the uniform distribution in the interval (0, 1), then the variate

This is obtained by applying the inverse transform sampling-method.

Related distributions

 The special case b = 1 yields the Fréchet distribution.
 Substituting  and  yields the Weibull distribution. Note, however, that a positive k (as in the Weibull distribution) would yield a negative a and hence a negative probability density, which is not allowed.

Based on The GNU Scientific Library, used under GFDL.

See also
 Extreme value theory
 Gumbel distribution

Continuous distributions